Hamburger SV (women) is a women's association football club from Hamburg, Germany. It is part of the Hamburger SV club.

History
The women's section of Hamburger SV was created in 1970 and played in the Bundesliga continuously since the 2003-04 and 2011-12 seasons. The team reached the final of the 2002 German Cup but lost 5-0 to 1. FFC Frankfurt, and it enjoyed its best result in the Bundesliga, a 4th place, in the 2010-11 season. However, in May 2012 the club announced its disestablishment, with its reserve team becoming the first team in the 2012-13 Regionalliga.

Current squad
2019–20 team.

Former players

References

External links
Official team site

Women
Women's football clubs in Germany
Football clubs in Hamburg
1970 establishments in West Germany
2012 disestablishments in Germany
Association football clubs established in 1970
Frauen-Bundesliga clubs